Clarksburg State Park is a  Massachusetts state park located in the town of Clarksburg. The park is made up of unspoiled northern hardwood forest, with views of the Hoosac Range, Mount Greylock and the Green Mountains. It is managed by the Department of Conservation and Recreation.

Activities and amenities
Mauserts Pond: The park's centerpiece, Mauserts Pond has a pavilion and landscaped picnic area. The pond, though weedy, offers opportunities for swimming, fishing and non-motorized boating (boat ramp available).
Trails: The park has  of trails including the  Pond Loop Trail. Trails may be used for hiking, walking, and cross-country skiing.
Camping: Forty-six sites are available from May to September. Campground office hours are from 8 am – 6 pm on weekdays, and 8 am – midnight on weekends. Universally accessible campsites and comfort station are available, along with showers.
The park is open for day use from sunrise to one half-hour after sunset, year-round. Facilities are available from Memorial Day through Labor Day. A parking fee is charged. 
Restrictions: Pets are permitted but must be on a  maximum leash. Proof of current rabies vaccination is required. Motorized off-road vehicles and alcoholic beverages are prohibited.

References

External links
Clarksburg State Park Department of Conservation and Recreation 
Clarksburg State Park Trail Map Department of Conservation and Recreation

State parks of Massachusetts
Massachusetts natural resources
Parks in Berkshire County, Massachusetts
Campgrounds in Massachusetts
Clarksburg, Massachusetts